Yvonne Patrice Leuko Chibosso (born 20 November 1991), known as Yvonne Leuko, is a Cameroonian football defender, currently playing for Arras FCF.

She appeared for Cameroon at the 2012 Summer Olympics, 2015 World Cup,  and the 2019 World Cup.

References

External links 
 

1991 births
Living people
People from West Region (Cameroon)
Cameroonian women's footballers
Women's association football defenders
ASPTT Albi players
Division 1 Féminine players
Cameroon women's international footballers
2015 FIFA Women's World Cup players
2019 FIFA Women's World Cup players
Cameroonian expatriate women's footballers
Cameroonian expatriate sportspeople in France
Expatriate women's footballers in France
FC Nantes (women) players

Footballers at the 2012 Summer Olympics